Fibroblast growth factor 23 (FGF23) is a protein and member of the fibroblast growth factor (FGF) family which participates in the regulation of phosphate in plasma and vitamin D metabolism. In humans it is encoded by the  gene. FGF23 decreases reabsorption of phosphate in the kidney. Mutations in FGF23 can lead to its increased activity, resulting in autosomal dominant hypophosphatemic rickets.

Description
Fibroblast growth factor 23 (FGF23) is a protein which in humans is encoded by the  gene. FGF23 is a member of the fibroblast growth factor (FGF) family which participates in phosphate and vitamin D metabolism and regulation.

Function 
FGF23´s main function is to regulate the phosphate concentration in plasma. It does this by decreasing reabsorption of phosphate in the kidney, which means phosphate is excreted in urine. FGF23 is secreted by osteocytes in response to increased calcitriol. FGF23 acts on the kidneys by decreasing the expression of NPT2, a sodium-phosphate cotransporter in the proximal tubule. 

FGF23 may also suppress 1-alpha-hydroxylase, reducing its ability to activate vitamin D and subsequently impairing calcium absorption.

Genetics
In humans FGF23 is encoded by the  gene, which is located on chromosome 12 and is composed of three exons. The gene was identified by its mutations associated with autosomal dominant hypophosphatemic rickets.

Clinical significance 

Mutations in FGF23, which render the protein resistant to proteolytic cleavage, lead to its increased activity and to renal phosphate loss, in the human disease autosomal dominant hypophosphatemic rickets. 

FGF23 can also be overproduced by some types of tumors, such as the benign mesenchymal neoplasm phosphaturic mesenchymal tumor causing tumor-induced osteomalacia, a paraneoplastic syndrome.

Loss of FGF23 activity is thought to lead to increased phosphate levels and the clinical syndrome of familial tumor calcinosis. Mice lacking either FGF23 or the klotho enzyme age prematurely due to hyperphosphatemia.

Over-expression of FGF23 has been associated with cardiovascular disease in chronic kidney disease including cardiomyocyte hypertrophy, vascular calcification, stroke, and endothelial dysfunction.

FGF23 expression and cleavage is promoted by iron deficiency and inflammation.

FGF23 is associated with at least 7 non-nutritional diseases of hypophosphatemia:  aside from autosomal dominant hypophosphatemic rickets, X-linked hypophosphatemia, autosomal recessive hypophosphatemic rickets type 1, 2, and 3, Tumor-induced osteomalacia and Hypophosphatemic rickets with hypercalciuria.

History
Prior to its discovery in 2000, it was hypothesized that a protein existed which performed the functions subsequently shown for FGF23. This putative protein was known as phosphatonin.  Several types of effects were described including impairment of sodium dependent phosphate transport in both intestinal and renal brush border membrane vesicles, inhibition of production of calcitriol, stimulation of breakdown of calcitriol, and inhibition of production/secretion of parathyroid hormone.

References

Further reading 

 
 
 
 
 
 
 
 
 
 
 
 
 
 
 
 
 

Growth factors